"Two to Make It Right" is a song by the American girl group Seduction, released as a single in late 1989. It appears on the group's first album, Nothing Matters Without Love featuring April Harris and Michelle Visage on lead vocals. "Two to Make It Right" peaked at number 2 on the Billboard Hot 100. The music video was directed by Stu Sleppin and produced by Bob Teeman.

The song was performed by drag queens Coco Montrese and Detox in the fifth season of the reality competition RuPaul's Drag Race, in which Visage is a main judge. "Two to Make It Right" was covered by British rock band Busted in 2018.

Composition
"Two to Make It Right" contains a sample of the song "Kiss" as performed by the Art of Noise featuring Tom Jones, and a sample of "It Takes Two" by Rob Base and DJ E-Z Rock, which itself contains a sample of Lyn Collins's "Think (About It)"; the latter song has its roots in James Brown's famous and often sampled "Yeah! Woo!" drum break.

Commercial reception
"Two to Make It Right" reached number 2 on the Billboard Hot 100 chart in the US in February 1990, staying there for two weeks. The song also spent one week at the top of the Billboard Hot Dance Club Play chart in January 1990 and twelve weeks on the chart.

Track listings
7-inch single – Europe
 "Two to Make It Right" (the radio mix) – 4:11
 "Two to Make It Right" (the house dub) – 5:12

7-inch single – US
 "Two to Make It Right" (7-inch remix) – 4:13
 "Two to Make It Right" (Original 7-inch) – 4:11

12-inch maxi – Europe
 "Two to Make It Right" (the club mix) – 6:20
 "Two to Make It Right" (the hip house vocal) – 6:18
 "Two to Make It Right" (the house dub) – 5:12

12-inch maxi – US
 "Two to Make It Right" (Cole / Clivillés club mix) – 6:20
 "Two to Make It Right" (Cole / Clivillés dub mix) – 5:02
 "Two to Make It Right" (7-inch remix) – 4:11
 "Two to Make It Right" (Hip house vocal mix) – 6:18
 "Two to Make It Right" (Cole / Clivillés house dub) – 5:12

CD maxi
 "Two to Make It Right" (the radio mix) – 4:11
 "Two to Make It Right" (the club mix) – 6:20
 "Two to Make It Right" (the hip house vocal) – 6:18

Credits
 Mixed by Bob Rosa
 Engineered by Steve Griffin
 Mastered by Ted Jensen
 Executive producer: Bruce Carbone and Larry Yasgar
 Edited by Clivillés, Cole and Ricky Crespo
 Produced by Clivillés & Cole

Chart performance

Weekly charts

Year-end charts

1 by DJ Seduction

See also
List of number-one dance singles of 1990 (U.S.)

References

1989 singles
1990 singles
Song recordings produced by Robert Clivillés
1989 songs
Seduction (group) songs
Cashbox number-one singles